Richard R. "Bud" Daugherty (April 15, 1890 – September 12, 1937) was an American football, basketball, baseball, and track and field coach and college athletics administrator. He served as the head football coach at Jamestown College—now known as the University of Jamestown—in Jamestown, North Dakota from 1916 to 1917, Dakota Wesleyan University in Mitchell, South Dakota from 1919 to 1926, and Albion College in Albion, Michigan from 1927 to 1935, compiling a career college football coaching record of 80–50–8. Daugherty was also the head basketball coach at Dakota Wesleyan from 1918 to 1927 and Albion from 1927 to 1937, tallying a career college basketball coaching mark of 149–114.

In 1928, Daugherty led the Albion football team to a Michigan Intercollegiate Athletic Association (MIAA) championship with an undefeated 8–0 record.  The team went 0–6–2 in 1935.  In January 1936, Daugherty announced his resignation as the school's football coach following criticism from alumni over the team's lack of success.  Daugherty was also Albion's athletic director and coached the baseball, basketball, and track teams.  His Albion teams won one MIAA championship in baseball and four in track.

Daugherty was in born in Wayzata, Minnesota and played college football from 1912 to 1914 as a halfback at the College of St. Thomas—now known as the University of St. Thomas—in Minnesota.

Daugherty later became the business manager for movie star Mae West. He died in 1937 at his home in Los Angeles.

Head coaching record

Football

References

External links
 

1890 births
1937 deaths
American football halfbacks
Basketball coaches from Minnesota
Albion Britons athletic directors
Albion Britons baseball coaches
Albion Britons football coaches
Albion Britons men's basketball coaches
Dakota Wesleyan Tigers baseball coaches
Dakota Wesleyan Tigers football coaches
Dakota Wesleyan Tigers men's basketball coaches
Jamestown Jimmies football coaches
St. Thomas (Minnesota) Tommies football players
College track and field coaches in the United States
People from Wayzata, Minnesota
Players of American football from Minnesota